The Etruscan (original title Turms, Kuolematon which translates to Turms, Immortal) is a novel by Mika Waltari, published in 1956, telling of the adventures of a young man, Turms, which begins approximately in 480 BC. It tells of the spiritual development of Turms, as he adventures from Greece to Sicily, then to Rome and then finally to Tuscany, where he learns of his immortality and his duties to the future. There are many actual historical events in this book, but how Turms gets involved in them is fictitious.

Novels by Mika Waltari
Historical novels
1956 novels
Novels set in Italy
Novels set in the 5th century BC
20th-century Finnish novels